Robert A. (Bob) Gearheart (born 1938) is an emeritus professor of environmental engineering at Humboldt State University, in Arcata, California.

Gearheart teaches courses in environmental impact assessment, hazardous waste management, water quality management, and Capstone.

His research interests include water and wastewater treatment, using appropriate technology, including constructed wetlands. He is also involved with a number of public and private sector agencies providing support for water supply facilities in developing countries, such as Indonesia, Kenya, Ghana, and Sierra Leone.

Gearheart is involved with the development of Arcata's Integrated Wetland and Wastewater Treatment Facility and the Arcata Marsh. The Arcata Marsh serves as a sewage treatment plant, a recreation area, a wildlife sanctuary and aquaculture project.

Gearheart received his B.A. in biology and mathematics from the University of North Texas, and his M.S. and Ph.D. in civil engineering from the University of Oklahoma.

References

External links
On-line workshop (broken link) with Bob Gearheart and Greg Gearheart (broken link)
The Sustainability Paradigm Dance Presentation by Bob Gearheart 
Emeritus web page

Environmental engineers
1938 births
Living people
University of Oklahoma alumni
University of North Texas alumni
Humboldt State University faculty
People from Arcata, California
Engineers from California